Bai Bing (born 2 May 1986) is a Chinese actress and singer.

Bai is noted for her roles as Xue Baochai and Princess Yushu in the television series The Dream of Red Mansions (2010) and The Myth (2010) respectively.

Early life and education
Bai was born in a merchant family in Xi'an, Shaanxi on May 2, 1986. Bai was the class commissary in charge of studies when she was a pupil. From 2001 to 2004, she was educated in Xi'an No.1 High school. She entered Northwest University of Politics and Law in 2004, majoring in international law, where she graduated in 2008.

Acting career
On July 26, 2004, Bai signed the Emperor Entertainment Group.

Bai had her first experience in front of the camera in 2007, and she was chosen to act as a supporting actor in the romantic comedy film Call for Love.

She also appeared in various films such as Crossed Lines, Fit Lover, Looking for Jackie, Let the Bullets Fly, The Founding of a Party, Mr. & Mrs. Single, Shaolin, The Viral Factor and CZ12.

Bai gained fame for her starring role as Xue Baochai in The Dream of Red Mansions, adapted from Cao Xueqin's classical novel of the same title.

In 2010, Bai played the role of Princess Yushu in the fantasy epic television series The Myth, for which she won the Huading Award for Favorite Actress.

In 2013, Bai acted in the historical drama Heroes in Sui and Tang Dynasties directed by Chung Siu Hung, playing the role of Xiao Meiniang.

Personal life
On December 10, 2013, Bai married Chinese model Ding Yi.

Filmography

Film

Television series

Discography

Awards and nominations

References

External links

 
 Michelle Bai at chinesemov.com

1986 births
Actresses from Xi'an
Chinese film actresses
Chinese television actresses
Living people
21st-century Chinese actresses